Willard Haley is an American politician currently serving in the Missouri House of Representatives from Missouri's 58th district. He won the seat unanimously after no other candidate ran in the election. He was sworn in on January 6, 2021.

Electoral History

References

Republican Party members of the Missouri House of Representatives
21st-century American politicians
Living people
Year of birth missing (living people)